BBC Two Wales is the national variation of BBC Two for BBC Cymru Wales. It is broadcast from Central Square in Cardiff with live continuity provided by a team of announcer/directors. The channel opts out from the main BBC Two schedule.

From 5 November 2001 until 2 January 2009, BBC Two Wales was the name of the analogue service broadcasting to Wales, and was the brand used on the digital service outside the broadcasting hours used by BBC 2W. BBC 2W was the sister channel to BBC Two Wales, until the digital switchover saw the end of analogue broadcasts in Wales. The specific BBC 2W service was closed down and the BBC Two Wales brand used.

Programming

Programming is much the same as BBC Two, with the exception of some Welsh-oriented programming. Frequently, schedules are changed as a result of an additional programme being inserted and other programmes seen on the BBC Two network being delayed until a slot becomes available.

Presentation is parallel to that of BBC Two itself, with BBC Two Wales sharing the same idents and channel design. The primary addition is the word 'Wales' under the BBC Two logo inside the box.

Availability
BBC Two Wales can be seen both in Wales on all television platforms, usually on Channels 2, or 102 depending on the system, and in other regions of the UK via most satellite providers and on some other digital television providers. Programmes shown exclusively on BBC Two Wales can also be seen again, for 28 days after broadcast on the BBC iPlayer service.

BBC Two Wales HD
BBC Two Wales was made available in high definition on 29 November 2018 on Freeview (in Wales only), Sky and Freesat, with addition to Virgin Media cable to follow on 4 December. On Freesat HD boxes, BBC Two Wales HD directly replaced the SD version on 102 in Wales and 971 elsewhere; the SD version was relocated to 106 in Wales (the slot previously used for the network BBC Two HD) and 979 elsewhere; viewers in Wales can now access the network version of BBC Two HD on 949. On Freeview HD in Wales, BBC Two Wales HD directly replaced the network version on 102. On Sky, the 'HD swap' facility places BBC Two Wales HD on 102 on HD boxes in Wales, with the SD and network versions further down the guide. Standard-definition receivers saw little change, with BBC Two Wales in SD remaining at 2/102 as before.

References

External links

Mass media in Wales
Television channels and stations established in 1965
BBC television channels in the United Kingdom
BBC Cymru Wales
1965 establishments in Wales